Sampson the Hospitable (died  530 AD) was a citizen of Constantinople who devoted his time to serving the poor of the city. 

He is venerated as a saint in the Eastern Churches as well in the Catholic Church.

Life 

Sampson (or Samson) was born in Rome to a prominent family.  He was a physician who devoted much of his time to helping the poor and sick. He turned his home into a free clinic, providing his patients with food and lodging as well as medical care. He was later ordained a priest by the patriarch. 
When the Byzantine emperor Justinian the Great became ill he sent for Sampson to cure him. He was the only physician in the city to do the emperor any good, and the emperor wanted to reward him. Sampson requested that the emperor help him establish a new hospital for the poor. With the emperor's assistance, Samson founded the hospital, which became the largest free clinic in the empire and served the people of Constantinople for 600 years.

Sampson was buried in the Church of the Holy Martyr Mocius in Constantinople. It was on his feast day that Peter the Great defeated Charles XII of Sweden in the Battle of Poltava. This led to his veneration in Russia, including the construction of St Sampson's Cathedral in St. Petersburg.

External links 
 Sampson the Hospitable
 Orthodox Calendar – Sampson the Hospitable
 Reconstruction of the Hospital of Sampson in Istanbul

530 deaths
6th-century Christian saints
Holy Unmercenaries
Physicians from Rome
6th-century Byzantine people
Physicians from Constantinople
Justinian I
Year of birth unknown